Henry Bonello (born 13 October 1988) is a Maltese international footballer who plays for Ħamrun Spartans as a goalkeeper.

Club career
Born in Pietà, Bonello has played club football for Sliema Wanderers, Vittoriosa Stars, Hibernians and Valletta. In a match for Sliema Wanderers on 29 January 2012, Bonello was described as a "hero" for his performance. He signed for Birkirkara in January 2017, with Rowen Muscat making the move in the opposite direction. He returned to Valletta in June 2017. He signed for Ħamrun Spartans in July 2021.

International career
He made his senior international debut for Malta on 29 February 2012, in the 2–1 win over Liechtenstein. On 23 March 2019, he saved a penalty in the 2–1 win over Faroe Islands in a UEFA Euro 2020 qualifier, as Malta won their first competitive home match in 13 years.

References

External links
 

1988 births
Living people
Maltese footballers
People from Pietà, Malta
Malta international footballers
Sliema Wanderers F.C. players
Vittoriosa Stars F.C. players
Hibernians F.C. players
Valletta F.C. players
Birkirkara F.C. players
Ħamrun Spartans F.C. players
Maltese Premier League players
Association football goalkeepers